Slim John was a 1969 BBC English Language Instruction serial made for overseas broadcast, in twenty-six episodes of fourteen minutes each, and in black and white. It involves android robots from outer space planning to take over the Earth, starting with London. They work following the directions of an authority called Control. Robot Five, nicknamed Slim John (Simon Williams), is himself a rebel robot who befriends a human couple, Stevie and Richard.

Slim John has extraordinary strength. The plots revolve around the other robots trying to eliminate him, and often include the fact that Slim John and the other robots have limited amounts of power available and need to recharge themselves regularly. Short grammar lessons are transmitted to all the robots at regular intervals via their hand-held communication devices (anticipating personal digital assistants by more than 30 years). These short lessons are presented not only to the robots (including Slim John), but in full screen to the viewers.

The serial was an educational tool used for English language instruction. It was supported by books and records as an English teaching method. The series was broadcast for years all over the world, in Turkey, Cyprus, Finland, France, Germany, Italy, Sweden, Brazil, Yugoslavia and other countries. Hungary, Poland and Romania were the only Eastern Bloc countries to show the serial, with an enormous response, in the 1970s.

Availability
The series was available on various media, television, radio, disks and books.

Cast
 Simon Williams.................Slim John
 Allan Lee...........................Richard
 Juliet Harmer.....................Stevie
 Valentine Dyall.................. Dr Brain
 Bruno Barnabe...................Miller
 Liz Reber...........................Zero

List of episodes
The man in the cupboard
Where is Robot Five?
Is he in London?
Orders from Control
Catch that robot!
Find the house!
Robot Five is dangerous
The shop in Park Street
There were some men in the shop
We're going away
Out of London
We need to sleep
I want my car
The village
There's no one in the car
The airfield
Don't let him escape!
The hospital
Copies of Robot Five
The football match
Back to headquarters
Ready for the meeting
It's late
Control is coming
Our plan must work
The last day

External links 
 Slim John (with some images)

BBC television dramas
1969 British television series debuts
1969 British television series endings